The .45 Winchester Magnum is a .45 caliber rimless cartridge intended for use in semi-automatic pistols. The cartridge is externally a lengthened .45 ACP with a thicker web to withstand higher operating pressures. The 45 Win Mag is nearly identical in dimensions and loading to the .45 NAACO developed by the North American Arms Corporation for their Brigadier pistol, developed to supply to the Canadian Army after World War II. The army ultimately did not adopt the pistol and its non-NATO standard ammunition.

The cartridge has been primarily used by small game hunters and metallic silhouette shooters.

Specifications
Although the .45 Winchester Magnum may be based on the .45 ACP and have the same Rim and Base dimensions, the .45 Winchester Magnum has no parent case. The .45 Winchester Magnum case is redrawn with thicker walls and longer case. The thicker wall dimensions of the .45 Winchester Magnum are designed to accommodate a higher internal pressure (40,000 cup) than that of the .45 ACP (18,000 cup [21,000psi or 140MPa]).

General comments
The .45 Winchester Magnum had been on the drawing board for two years before its introduction, in 1979, by Winchester. The cartridge did not gain much popularity due to the intermittent availability of the Wildey and LAR Grizzly pistols. The cartridge was chambered in the Thompson-Center Contender single shot pistols. The cartridge was also chambered for the Freedom Arms Model 83 single-action revolver via an available optional cylinder.

The .45 Winchester Magnum gained a following among IHMSA competitors as it provided the power and performance necessary to knock down targets at an extended range. The cartridge has been used by handgun hunters and is among the few semi-automatic pistol (as opposed to revolver) cartridges which have been adopted for this sport.

See also
 Table of handgun and rifle cartridges
 List of handgun cartridges
.45 Super
.45 ACP
.44 Magnum
.45 GAP
.475 Wildey Magnum
10 mm caliber
11 mm caliber

References

Magnum pistol cartridges
Pistol and rifle cartridges
Winchester Repeating Arms Company cartridges